The Kiritimatiellota are a phylum of bacteria.

References

Bacteria phyla